Ancient Near East studies (or ANE studies) is the field of academic study of the Ancient Near East (ANE). As such it is an umbrella term for Assyriology, in some cases extending to Egyptology.

History of ANE studies
In Britain the first Assyriological appointments in the University of London date to 1904, when T. G. Pinches of the British Museum was appointed to a professorship.

Societies
 American Oriental Society
 ARAM – ARAM Society for Syro-Mesopotamian Studies
 ASOR – American Schools of Oriental Research, Boston
 British Institute for the Study of Iraq
 CEHAO – Centro de Estudios de Historia del Antiguo Oriente, Argentina
 Council for British Research in the Levant
 Deutsche Orient-Gesellschaft
 The Melammu Project The Assyrian and Babylonian Intellectual Heritage Project, Helsinki.
 Royal Asiatic Society of Great Britain and Ireland
 Société Asiatique, Paris

Universities with major ANE centres
 Pontifical Catholic University of Argentina
 University of Chicago Oriental Institute
 Columbia University
 New York University Institute for Study of the Ancient World

Common abbreviations of cited journals, sources and lexicons
The following list does not include journals in the field of Old Testament studies.
 Abzu – Bibliography From the Oriental Institute of the University of Chicago
 Ancient Near East Monographs (ANEM)
 ANES – Ancient Near Eastern Studies Annual journal from the University of Melbourne dedicated to the languages and cultures of the ancient Near East.
 ANET & ANEP – Ancient Near East Texts (Princeton 1950, 1955, 3rd ed. 1969)
 AntOr – Antiguo Oriente
 BASOR – Bulletin of the American Schools of Oriental Research
 CAD – Chicago Assyrian Dictionary
 CHD – Chicago Hittite Dictionary
 ETANA – Electronic Tools and Ancient Neareastern Archives
 ETCSL – Electronic Text Corpus of Sumerian Literature, Oxford
 JEOL – Jaarbericht Ex Oriente Lux
 JESHO – Journal of the Economic and Social History of the Orient
 JCS – Journal of Cuneiform Studies
 JNES – Journal of Near Eastern Studies
 JSS – Journal of Semitic Studies
 KTU² - Keilschrift Texte aus Ugarit
 LAPO – Littératures anciennnes du Proche-Orient 1967–2002
 NEA – Near Eastern Archaeology Magazine
 Revista del Instituto de Historia Antigua Oriental
 RLA – Reallexikon der Assyriologie
 TUAT – Texte aus der Umwelt des Alten Testament 1982–1995, 2002

See also
 Genetic history of the Middle East
 Religions of the ancient Near East / Middle Eastern mythology
 Chronology of the ancient Near East
 Middle Eastern studies

References

Further reading
 ABZU bibliography, "A guide to networked open access data relevant to the study and public presentation of the Ancient Near East and the Ancient Mediterranean world"

Oriental studies
Ancient Near East